is a United States Marine Corps air station located in the Nishiki river delta,  southeast of Iwakuni Station in the city of Iwakuni, Yamaguchi Prefecture, Japan.

History
The Japanese government bought a large portion of what is today MCAS Iwakuni in 1938, with the view of establishing a naval air station. They commissioned the new base 8 July 1940. When World War II started, the Iwakuni air station was used as a training and defense base. The station housed 96 trainers and 150 Zero fighter planes on the airstrip. In September 1943, a branch of the Etajima Naval Academy was established here, with approximately 1,000 cadets undergoing training in the Basic, Junior and Senior Officer's schools at any one time. American B-29's bombed Iwakuni in May and August 1945, concentrating on the oil refinery and Rail Transport Office or train station areas. The last air raid took place just a day before the war was brought to a close.

The first allies to reach Iwakuni at the war's end were a group of U.S. Marines who had signed papers ending the conflict for the Japanese air base. After the end of World War II, various military forces from the United States, Britain, Australia, and New Zealand occupied the base and it was repaired by No. 5 Airfield Construction Squadron RAAF and designated a Royal Australian Air Force Base in 1948. The Americans first occupied the base in 1950 to use it as a springboard for aircraft heading to the Korean War. In 1952, the base officially became a United States military base.

Iwakuni had scheduled international service by private airlines from 1952 to 1964, during which time it had the IATA airport code IWJ. This code was later reassigned to Iwami Airport in neighboring Shimane Prefecture.

Nuclear weapons were moved from Okinawa to the base for storage during a brief period in 1966. When U.S. ambassador to Japan Edwin O. Reischauer learned of the presence of the weapons, which was a violation of the Treaty of Mutual Cooperation and Security between the United States and Japan, he told the United States Department of State that if the weapons were not removed within 90 days he would resign and go public with the information. The weapons were removed shortly thereafter, and their presence at the base did not become publicly known until 2010.

It is currently home to around 5,000 United States Marines and family members. The base is detailed for Marine pilot training and air patrol, using F/A-18 Hornet fighter-attack aircraft among others in compliance with the Treaty of Mutual Cooperation and Security obligations to protect Japan. MCAS Iwakuni is also shared with the Japanese Maritime Self Defense Force. MCAS Iwakuni is home to a Department of Defense school, Matthew C. Perry (Elementary, Middle School and High School).

A new off-shore runway opened at the base on 30 May 2010. The new runway is 2,440 meters in length.

On 22 November 2017, a C-2A Greyhound cargo plane with 11 crew and passengers aboard crashed southeast of Okinawa after departing the base for the aircraft carrier USS Ronald Reagan.  Eight of the 11 were rescued.

On 6 December 2018, an F/A-18D Hornet (callsign "Profane 12") belonging to VMFA(AW)-242 collided mid air with a KC-130 (callsign "Sumo 41") from VMGR-152 during a nighttime training exercise. The crew of Sumo 41 were killed in the collision along with the pilot of Profane 12. The co-pilot of Profane 12 was rescued by JMSDF Search & Rescue in Japanese waters. An investigation into the accident was led by the Marine Corps. ProPublica later conducted their own independent investigation after finding the Marine Corps initial results to be inaccurate.

USN Carrier Air Wing 5 relocation to MCAS Iwakuni
Since at least 2005 there had been plans to relocate Carrier Air Wing Five's fixed wing aircraft from Naval Air Facility Atsugi in Kanagawa Prefecture to Iwakuni. Yamaguchi governor Sekinari Nii said there was "no way" Yamaguchi prefecture would accept this. In 2006 Iwakuni voters rejected the plan in a plebiscite and Iwakuni mayor Katsusuke Ihara urged Tokyo to drop the plan. In 2007 the Japanese government passed legislation to prepare for the relocation of US Forces in Japan including subsidies for local affected areas.

The move was planned to have been done in 2014, but after construction delays the move was delayed by three years, to 2017.

The move did not include the wing's two helicopter squadrons. The first CVW-5 squadron, VAW-125 flying the E-2D Hawkeye arrived in January 2017. The Boeing E/A-18G Growlers of VAQ-141 "Shadowhawks" completed relocation in January, 2018.  By March 2018, all fixed wing aircraft of Carrier Air Wing 5 had completed relocation from NAF Atsugi.

USMC F-35B aircraft
The first aircraft of Marine Fighter Attack Squadron 121 "Green Knights" (VMFA-121) arrived on 18 January 2017. This became the first forward deployed F-35B Lightning II squadron in the United States Marine Corps. They have since flown show of force sorties against North Korea.

Role and operations

US Marine Corps

Marine Aircraft Group 12 (MAG-12) contains the rotary and fixed wing aircraft assets of Marine Corps Air Station Iwakuni. MAG-12 is home to three flying squadrons, an aviation logistics squadron, and a ground support squadron.
VMFA-242 "Bats"— one of two permanent forward deployed Marine F-35B Lightning II fighter squadrons.
VMFA-121 "Green Knights"- the other permanent forward deployed Marine F-35B Lightning II fighter squadron.
VMGR-152 "Sumos" — moved here from MCAS Futenma in Okinawa commencing in June 2014 with their 15 KC-130J Super Hercules.
Marine Aviation Logistics Squadron 12 (MALS-12) provides logistics support, guidance, and direction to MAG-12 and other commands aboard the Station. Click on the link to the right for more information on the Marauders.
Marine Wing Support Squadron 171 (MWSS-171) provides essential Aviation Ground Support to the Station
Headquarters and Headquarters Squadron (H&HS) provides administrative support and conducts training in general military skills for more than 800 Marines and sailors aboard MCAS Iwakuni.
Combat Logistics Company 36 (CLC-36) Provides logistic support to MWSS-171 and MAG 12.

US Air Force
The 374th Communications Squadron provides communications support to H&HS, MAG-12, Branch Medical Clinic Iwakuni, Army Corps of Engineers, and the JMSDF.

Based units 
Flying and notable non-flying units based at MCAS Iwakuni.

United States Marine Corps 
Marine Corps Installations – Pacific

 Headquarters and Headquarters Squadron – UC-12W Huron

1st Marine Aircraft Wing

 Marine Aircraft Group 12
 Marine Aerial Refueler Transport Squadron 152 (VMGR-152) – KC-130J Super Hercules
 Marine Fighter Attack Squadron 242 (VFMA-242) – F-35B Lightning II
 Marine Aviation Logistics Squadron 12 (MALS-12)
 Marine Fighter Attack Squadron 121 (VMFA-121) – F-35B Lightning II
 Marine Wing Support Squadron 171 (MWSS-171)

3rd Marine Logistics Group

 Combat Logistics Regiment 35
 Combat Logistics Company 36 (CLC-36)

United States Air Force 
Pacific Air Forces (PACAF)

 Fifth Air Force
 374th Airlift Wing
 374th Mission Support Group
 374th Communications Squadron
 Operating Location Bravo

United States Navy 
US Pacific Fleet

 Naval Air Force Pacific
 Carrier Air Wing Five (CVW-5)
 Carrier Airborne Early Warning Squadron 125 (VAW-125) – E-2C Hawkeye
 Fleet Logistics Support Squadron Composite 30 (VRC-30)
 Detachment 5 – C-2A Greyhound
 Electronic Attack Squadron 141 (VAQ-141) – EA-18G Growler
 Helicopter Sea Combat Squadron 25 (HSC-25)
 Detachment 6 – MH-60S Seahawk
 Strike Fighter Squadron 27 (VFA-27)  – F/A18E Super Hornet
 Strike Fighter Squadron 102 (VFA-102)  – F/A18F Super Hornet
 Strike Fighter Squadron 115 (VFA-115)  – F/A18E Super Hornet
 Strike Fighter Squadron 195 (VFA-195)  – F/A18E Super Hornet

Japan Maritime Self-Defense Force 

Fleet Air Force
Fleet Air Wing 31
Air Patrol Squadron 71 – US-1A and US-2
Air Patrol Squadron 81 –  EP-3 and OP-3C
Air Patrol Squadron 91 – UP-3D and U-36A
Mine Countermeasures Helicopter Squadron 111 – MCH-101

Commercial services

Regular commercial service started from 13 December 2012 with a civilian airport terminal built to accommodate commercial flights. It was initially projected that up to 430,000 passengers would use the airport each year, and in the first seven months of operations the airport handled over 200,000 passengers, with average load factors between Iwakuni and Tokyo exceeding 70% during June 2013.

Since IATA airport code IWJ, formerly assigned to Iwakuni, was already reassigned to Iwami Airport, new IATA code of IWK was assigned to Iwakuni. The inaugural flight was operated by All Nippon Airways from Haneda Airport. Also, Iwakuni Airport will be called by its official nickname "Iwakuni Kintaikyo Airport", named after the Kintaikyo bridge near the airport. In the future, they plan to serve international flights to China and South Korea and some other cities within Japan.

Airlines and destinations

Friendship Day

Every year on 5 May, Japanese nationals and U.S. service members, government employees and their families officially celebrate their long-standing friendship by opening the gates of MCAS Iwakuni for one of Japan's largest air shows dedicated to enhancing the friendship of the two nations. The event, entitled Friendship Day, hosts an average 250,000 visitors who travel from all over Japan.

See also

List of United States Marine Corps installations
List of airports in Japan

References
This article incorporates text in the public domain from the United States Marine Corps.

External links

MCAS Iwakuni, official site
An Insider's Guide to USMC Bases including Iwakuni

active
Installations of the U.S. Department of Defense in Japan
Airports in Japan
Transport in Yamaguchi Prefecture
Buildings and structures in Yamaguchi Prefecture
Military airbases established in 1940
1940 establishments in Japan
Iwakuni, Yamaguchi